Queen are a British rock band, whose classic line-up consisted of vocalist and pianist Freddie Mercury, guitarist Brian May, drummer Roger Taylor and bassist John Deacon. Since the 1970s, Queen has sold 300 million records worldwide, making them one of the best-selling artists in history. Billboard ranked them as the 87th Greatest Artist of All Time. According to RIAA, Queen has sold 86.5 million certified records in the US.

Founded in 1970, Queen released their self-titled debut album in 1973. Despite not being an immediate success, they quickly gained popularity in Britain with their second album Queen II in 1974. Their 1975 single, "Bohemian Rhapsody", was No. 1 in the UK charts for nine weeks (and a further five weeks in 1991 after Mercury's death) and is the third-biggest-selling single of all time in the UK. In the US, "Bohemian Rhapsody" hit the Billboard Top 40 charts in three different decades, reaching No. 9 on its original release in 1975, No. 2 in 1992 after being featured in the film Wayne's World, and hitting the Top 40 once more in 2018 upon the release of the Queen biopic Bohemian Rhapsody. The 1981 compilation Greatest Hits is the biggest-selling album in UK history, with 6 million copies sold by 2014. The 1991 compilation Greatest Hits II is also one of the UK's top ten biggest-sellers of all time, with 3.8 million copies sold by 2012.

In 1972, Queen signed a production deal with Trident Studios. Later in their career, Queen signed a record contract with EMI, and Elektra in the United States. The band would remain with EMI for the rest of their career, although in 1983 they terminated their American contract with Elektra and signed with Capitol Records. However, in 1990, they terminated their US contract with Capitol and signed with Disney's Hollywood Records, which has remained the current owner and distributor of Queen's entire music catalogue in North America.

In 1991, Queen's entire catalog was remastered and released by Hollywood on CD in the United States, and 13 albums (all studio albums up to The Works, as well as Live Killers and Greatest Hits) were remastered at Abbey Road Studios and released on CD and cassette in the United Kingdom between July 1993 and March 1994. Queen's entire album back catalog was remastered and re-released in the UK and the rest of the world (excluding the US) through 2011 to commemorate their 40th anniversary (as well as being the 20th anniversary of Mercury's death). The 2011 remasters were released by Universal's Island Records label, as the band's contract with EMI ended in 2010, and then on SACD by Universal Music Japan, between November 2011 and April 2012. In an interview with BBC Wales, Brian May announced a new compilation album titled Queen Forever, which was later released by Hollywood Records in November 2014.

In 2012, Queen were ranked as being the seventh-biggest-selling singles artist in United Kingdom, with 12.6 million singles sold. In a time period stretching from 1991 up to October 1995, Queen sold five million copies in Italy alone.

Albums

Studio albums

Live albums

Compilation albums

Notes
 A Greatest Hits charted originally at number 5 on the Compilation Albums Chart, but the remastered version in 2011 qualified for an entry on the Top 200 Albums Chart when it peaked at number 56 in March 2011.
 B Greatest Hits II charted originally at number 1 on the Compilation Albums Chart, but the remastered version in 2011 qualified for an entry on the Top 200 Albums Chart when it peaked at number 57 in March 2011.
 Before 2011 compilation albums were not listed on the Top 200 Albums Chart in France, but instead on a separate chart for compilation albums only. The French chart positions here for the compilation albums are their peak positions on the French Compilation Albums Chart.

Box sets

 Before 2011 compilation albums were not listed on the Top 200 Albums Chart in France, but instead on a separate chart for compilation albums only. The French chart positions here for the compilation albums are their peak positions on the French Compilation Albums Chart.

Extended plays

Singles

1970s

1980s

1990s

2000s

2010s

2020s

Promotional singles

As featured / collaborating artist

Promotional singles

Notes
A^ The song was also released on John Farnham's 2003 compilation album One Voice: Greatest Hits.

Chart re-entries

Collaborations and other appearances

Video games

Music videos

See also
Brian May discography
Freddie Mercury discography
Roger Taylor discography
Queen + Paul Rodgers Discography

References

External links
 Queen discography at Queen official website
 

Discography
Discographies of British artists
Rock music group discographies